The women's pole vault event  at the 2000 European Athletics Indoor Championships was held on February 25–27.

Medalists

Results

Qualification
Qualification: Qualification Performance 4.30 (Q) or at least 8 best performers advanced to the final.

Final

References
Results

Pole vault at the European Athletics Indoor Championships
Pole
2000 in women's athletics